Initial Group B of the 1998 Fed Cup Americas Zone Group I was one of six pools in the Americas Zone Group I of the 1998 Fed Cup. Three teams competed in a round robin competition, with the team coming first advancing to Placement Pool A, the team coming second going to Placement Pool B, and the team coming last falling to Placement Pool C.

Colombia vs. Brazil

Colombia vs. Chile

Brazil vs. Chile

See also
Fed Cup structure

References

External links
 Fed Cup website

1998 Fed Cup Americas Zone